Penicillium italicum is a plant pathogen. It is a common post harvest disease commonly associated with citrus fruits.

Management
Inoculation of healthy fruit can be diminished and controlled by careful picking, handling, and packaging of the citrus so that the rinds are not damaged. Without chance of injury inflicted on the fruit, the conidia are unable to gain access, and thus unable to germinate into infectious pathogens.

References

External links
 USDA ARS Fungal Database

Fungi described in 1894
Fungal citrus diseases
italicum